In number theory, the gcd-sum function,
also called Pillai's arithmetical function, is defined for every  by

or equivalently

it also can be written as

This multiplicative arithmetical function was introduced by the Indian mathematician Subbayya Sivasankaranarayana Pillai in 1933.

References

Arithmetic functions